The Minister of Finance (or simply, Finance Minister) is the head of the Ministry of Finance of the Government of Zimbabwe. One of the senior-most offices in the Cabinet of Zimbabwe, the finance minister is responsible for the fiscal policy of the government. As part of this, a key duty of the Finance Minister is to present the annual Budget in Parliament of Zimbabwe, which details the government's plan for taxation (revenue collection) and spending in the coming financial year. 
Through the Budget, the finance minister also outlines the allocations to different ministries and departments. Occasionally, he is assisted by the Minister of State for Finance and the lower-ranked Deputy Minister of Finance. Since Zimbabwe's independence in 1980 here's the list of Finance Ministers to date:

Enos Nkala, 1980 - 1982
Bernard Chidzero, 1982 - 1995
Ariston Chambati, April 1995 - October 1995
Emmerson Mnangagwa, November 1995 - April 1996, acting
Herbert Murerwa, April 1996 - July 2000
Simba Makoni, July 2000 - August 2002
Herbert Murerwa, August 2002 - February 2004
Christopher Kuruneri, February 2004 - 26 April 2004
Herbert Murerwa, 26 April 2004 - 6 February 2007
Samuel Mumbengegwi, 6 February 2007 – December 2008
Patrick Chinamasa, 7 January 2009 - 13 February 2009, acting
Tendai Biti, February 2009 - July 2013
Patrick Chinamasa, 11 September 2013 - 9 October 2017 
Ignatius Chombo, 10 October 2017 - 27 November 2017
Patrick Chinamasa, 21 November 2017 - 7 September 2018
Mthuli Ncube, 7 September 2018 to present

See also
Ministry of Finance (Zimbabwe)
Ministry of Finance (Rhodesia)

References

Politics of Zimbabwe
Finance
Finance Ministers